Carpathian Forest is a Norwegian black metal band formed by Nattefrost and Nordavind in 1992.

History 
In late 1990, the band originally started under the name Enthrone by Nattefrost (then bearing the pseudonym Lord Nosferatu) and Nordavind (who used the pseudonym Lord Karnstein). Together they produced a self-released demo tape, Black Winds, in 1991.

In 1992, Enthrone changed its name to "Carpathian Forest", and Lord Blackmangler and Damnatus joined their line-up. As a quartet they self-released three demo tapes: Rehearsal Outtake, Bloodlust and Perversion (both in 1992) and Journey Through the Cold Moors of Svarttjern (in 1993). However, Damnatus and Lord Blackmangler left afterwards, and Carpathian Forest became once more a duo.

Carpathian Forest would release their first studio work in 1995: the extended play Through Chasm, Caves and Titan Woods, via Avantgarde Music. It would be their first of many releases via Avantgarde.

In 1998 the band released their first full-length album, Black Shining Leather, once more via Avantgarde Music. It was their only release to feature Lazare (who would later join Borknagar) on the band's line-up as a drummer. In the same year they also played their first concert at the Under the Black Sun Festival in Schönermark, Germany.

Lazare left Carpathian Forest in 1999, the same year Anders Kobro, Tchort and Daniel Vrangsinn joined them as permanent members. In the following year, their second full-length, Strange Old Brew, was released. It was their most experimental album so far. By the end of the year they also released a single, "He's Turning Blue".

In 2001, founding member Nordavind left Carpathian Forest, during the recording sessions of their third studio album, Morbid Fascination of Death, that still retained the experimentation (although to a lesser extent) of their previous release, Strange Old Brew. In the following year the compilation album We're Going to Hell for This: Over a Decade of Perversions was released, in order to celebrate the band's 10th anniversary as Carpathian Forest. It was their last album to be released by Avantgarde Music before they switched on to Season of Mist.

Their fourth full-length, Defending the Throne of Evil, was released in 2003 by Season of Mist. Contrasting with Carpathian Forest's previous releases, it was their most melodic album so far, almost reminiscent of symphonic black metal. In late 2003 the band was joined by Gøran "Blood Pervertor" Bomann.

2004 saw the release of a live DVD, We're Going to Hollywood for This, and a compilation album featuring rarities and reworked versions of old Carpathian Forest songs, Skjend hans lik (Norwegian for "Desecrate His Body").

Carpathian Forest's latest studio album was the 2006 release Fuck You All!!!! Caput tuum in ano est, that was a throwback to their early, blackened thrash metal-like sonority of their debut.

In an early 2008 issue of Terrorizer, Tchort spoke about the possibility of a new album, and the rumors circulating regarding a "half-finished album". He is quoted as saying: "I met with Nattefrost a few weeks ago and we decided to focus on a new album, but we haven't even started writing it yet. The news that we had an album half-finished was based on the fact that we had material left over from the last album. Since we record in different studios, this meant that I had the basics for music that Nattefrost never heard". He also divulged that "[we] kind of decided on a slightly new direction for the band, compared to Fuck You All, at least".

The band frontlined the Inferno Festival in 2009, and confirmed rumors that a new album was in the works.

The band entered on a relative hiatus after 2009, but from 2012 onwards they began to play on some festivals around Europe. The band was scheduled to play on the Maryland Deathfest on 26 May 2013, but their show had to be cancelled due to last-minute visa problems. The band's last-known concert was at Incineration Fest, in London England in May 2019.

In the band's concerts in 2013–2014, Jonathan Perez from Green Carnation (and former Sirenia and Trail Of Tears) stepped in as their live drummer.

The band went on hiatus in July 2014, after Tchort and Blood Pervertor announced they had parted ways with Carpathian Forest, and would form a new band called The 3rd Attempt.

In 2017, the band returned, and announced that they were working on a new album which would be called Likskue, to be released in 2018.

Discography

Studio albums 
 Black Shining Leather (1998)
 Strange Old Brew (2000)
 Morbid Fascination of Death (2001)
 Defending the Throne of Evil (2003)
 Fuck You All!!!! Caput tuum in ano est (2006)

Extended plays 
 Through Chasm, Caves and Titan Woods (1995)
 Likeim (2018)

Compilations 
 Bloodlust and Perversion (1997)
 We're Going to Hell for This: Over a Decade of Perversions (2002)
 Skjend hans lik (2004)

Video releases 
 We're Going to Hollywood for This: Live Perversions (2004)

Demo tapes 
 Black Winds (1991 — as Enthrone)
 Rehearsal Outtake (1992)
 Bloodlust and Perversion (1992)
 Journey Through the Cold Moors of Svarttjern (1993)

Singles 
 "He's Turning Blue" (2000)

Band members 

Current members
 Nattefrost (Roger Rasmussen) — vocals, all other instruments (1992–present)
  Vrangsinn (Daniel Salte) — bass (1999–2014, 2019–present)
 Malphas — guitars (2017–present)
 Erik Gamle — guitars (2017–present)
 Audun — drums (2017–present)

Former members
 Damnatus — bass (1992–1993)
 Nordavind (Johnny Krøvel) — bass, guitars, keyboards, backing vocals (1992–2001)
 Lord Blackmangler — drums (1992–1993)
 Lazare (Lars Are Nedland) — drums, percussion (1998–1999)
 Blood Pervertor (Gøran Bomann) — guitars, backing vocals (2003–2014)
 Tchort (Terje Vik Schei) — bass, guitars (1999–2009, 2012–2014)
 Slakt (Kjetil Dyvik Løksli) — bass (2017–2019)
 Anders Kobro — drums, percussion (1999–2014)

Session musicians
 Grimm — bass (1993)
 Svein H. Kleppe — drums, percussion (1995)
 John M. Harr — bass guitar, fretless bass (1995)
 Arvid Thorsen (Mötorsen) — tenor saxophone (2000–2003)
 Nina Hex — female backing vocals (2000–2001)

Live musicians
 Jonathan Pérez — drums (2013–present)
 Hoest (Ørjan Stedjeberg) — vocals (2003)

Timeline

References

External links 

 
 

Norwegian black metal musical groups
Musical groups established in 1990
1990 establishments in Norway
Musical quintets
Musical groups from Rogaland
Musical groups from Kristiansand
Season of Mist artists